Augusto Genina (28 January 1892 – 18 September 1957) was an Italian film pioneer. He was a movie producer and director.

Biography
Born in Rome, Genina was a drama critic and wrote comedies for the Il Mondo Magazine, under advise of Aldo de Benedetti switches to movies for the "Film d'Arte Italiana", that produces his first film "La moglie di sua eccellenza".
In 1929 Genina moved to France to direct Louise Brooks in sonorized film  Miss Europe. He studied sound techniques and worked in France and Germany in  same but alternate languages film versions which were filmed simultaneously, before his return to Italy.

He won Venice Film Festival Mussolini's cup for Best Italian Film twice, in 1936 by Lo squadrone bianco and in 1940 by The Siege of the Alcazar, both Fascist propaganda films.

In 1953, he filmed Three Forbidden Stories, another version of the real accident depicted by Giuseppe De Santis one year before in Rome 11 o'clock (Roma ore 11).

Filmography

 La moglie di sua eccellenza (1913)
 Il segreto del castello di Monroe (1914)
 Il piccolo cerinaio (1914)
 La parola che uccide (1914)
 La fuga dei diamanti (1914)
 Dopo il veglione (1914)
 L'anello di Siva (1914)
 Lulu (1915 film) (1915)
 Gelosia (1915)
 La farfalla dalle ali d'oro (1915)
 Mezzanotte (1915)
 Doppia ferita (1915)
 Cento H.P. (1915)
 La conquista dei diamanti (1915)
 L'ultimo travestimento (1916)
 Il sopravvissuto (1916)
 Il sogno di un giorno (1916)
 Il dramma della corona (1916)
 La signorina Ciclone (1916)
 Il siluramento dell'Oceania (1917)
 Maschiaccio (1917)
 Lucciola (1917)
 Il trono e la seggiola (1918)
 The Prince of the Impossible (1918)
 L'onestà del peccato (1918)
 Kalidaa - la storia di una mummia (1918)
 L'emigrata (1918)
 I due crocifissi (1918)
 Goodbye Youth (1918)
 Femmina - Femina (1918)
 Lo scaldino (1919)
 Lucrezia Borgia (1919)
 Noris (1919)
 La donna e il cadavere (1919)
 La maschera e il volto (1919)
 Bel ami (1919)
 Le avventure di Bijou (1919)
 I diabolici (1920)
 I tre sentimentali (1920)
 La ruota del vizio (1920)
 Moglie, marito e... (1920)
 La douloureuse (1920)
 Il castello della malinconia (1920)
 L'avventura di Dio (1920)
 Debito d'odio (1920)
 L'incatenata (1921)
 La crisi (1921)
 Un punto nero (1922)
 La peccatrice senza peccato (1922)
 Una donna passò (1922)
 Lucie de Trecoeur (1922)
 Germaine (1923)
 Il corsaro (1924)
 La moglie bella (1924)
 Cirano de Bergerac (1925)
 The Hearth Turned Off (1925)
 L'ultimo lord (1926)
 The Prisoners of Shanghai (1927)
 Goodbye Youth (1927)
 The White Slave (Die Weisse Sklavin, 1927)
 Scampolo (1928)
 The Story of a Little Parisian (1928)
 Love's Masquerade (1928)
 Un dramma a sedici anni (1929)
 La congiura delle beffe (1929)
 Latin Quarter (1929)
 Miss Europe (1930)
 The Darling of Paris (Paris-Beguin, 1931)
 La femme en homme (1931)
 Gli amanti di mezzanotte (1931)
 We Are Not Children (1934)
 Non ti scordar di me (1935)
 Forget Me Not (1935)
 The Phantom Gondola (1936)
 Lo squadrone bianco (The White Squadron, 1936)
 Flowers from Nice (1936)
 The Kiss of Fire (Napoli terra d'amore, 1937)
 Amore e dolore di donna (1937)
 Woman's Love—Woman's Suffering (1937)
 Castles in the Air (1939)
 L'assedio dell'Alcazar (1939–40)
 Bengasi (1942)
 Heaven Over the Marshes (Cielo sulla palude, 1949)
 Devotion (1950)
 Three Forbidden Stories (Tre storie proibite, 1953)
 Maddalena (1954)
 Frou-Frou (1955)

External links 
 

1892 births
1957 deaths
Film directors from Rome
Nastro d'Argento winners
Italian film producers
Italian film directors